Hosapete Junction railway station, also called as Hospet Junction railway station or Vijayanagara Junction railway station (Station code: HPT) is a railway station in Vijayanagara district, Karnataka. It serves Hosapete city. The station consists of three platforms. It is a station with fuel and water filling facility, like Hubballi Railway station, station have amenities such as a computerized reservation office, waiting room, retiring room, book stall & canteenss.

Major trains
Some of the important trains that run from Hosapete Junction are:
 Amaravati Express
 Hampi Express
 Kacheguda–Hubballi Prasanti Nilayam Express
 Hubballi–Chennai express (via Bellary)
 Hyderabad–CSMT Kolhapur Express
 Mysuru–Sainagar Shirdi Weekly Express
 Kacheguda–Vasco Da Gama Express
 Ajmer–Bengaluru City Garib Nawaz Express
 Haripriya Express
 Bhagat Ki Kothi–Bengaluru City Express (Via Bellari)
 Hubballi–Vijayawada Express
 Tirupati–Hubballi Intercity Passenger
 Bengaluru City–Hosapete Passenger
 Ballari–Dharwad Passenger
 Hosapete-Harihar DEMU
 Yesvantpur-Nizamuddin Sampark Kranti Express

References

Railway stations in Bellary district
Railway junction stations in Karnataka
Hubli railway division